Mirganj is a town and a notified area in Gopalganj district in the Indian states of Bihar.

Geography 
It has an average elevation of .It occupies an area of

.

Demographics
As of the 2011 Census of India, Mirganj town had a population of 26,240, of which 13,427 are males while 12,813 are females. Population within the age group of 0 to 6 years was 4,015 which is 15.30% of total population of Mirganj town. Mirganj had an average literacy rate of 65%, higher than the state average of 61.8% with male literacy of 55.43%, and female literacy was 44.57%.

Bhojpuri, Hindi is the locally spoken language of Mirganj.

References

 

Cities and towns in Gopalganj district, India